Paul Galloway (14 September 1943 – 20 August 1996) was an Australian cricketer. He played eleven first-class matches for South Australia between 1968 and 1970.

See also
 List of South Australian representative cricketers

References

External links
 

1943 births
1996 deaths
Australian cricketers
Cricketers from Sydney
South Australia cricketers